Dorothy Kathleen Gulliver (September 6, 1908 – May 23, 1997) was an American silent film actress, and one of the few to make a successful transition when films began using sound.

Biography
The daughter of Mr. and Mrs. Fred Gulliver, she was born in Salt Lake City, Utah, in 1908 and was raised as a Mormon. From childhood, she wanted to be an actress. After she won the Miss Salt Lake City beauty contest in 1924 a scout for Paramount sought to have her go to Hollywood, but her mother opposed that plan. In June 1925, she won a beauty contest sponsored by Universal, with her awards including a six-month contract with Universal at a salary of $50 per week.

Gulliver's early work at Universal included two short films and two serials, The Winking Idol (1926) and Strings of Steel (1926). She was named as a 1928 WAMPAS Baby Star. Gulliver was part of The Collegians silent series of the late 1920s, and did some silent serials with William Desmond, Jack Hoxie, and Hoot Gibson. With the beginning of sound films, she became a popular heroine in 1930s "cliffhangers", including The Galloping Ghost, Phantom of the West, The Shadow of the Eagle, The Last Frontier, and the 1936 Custer's Last Stand. Her costars were often Rex Lease, Tim McCoy, Jack Hoxie, and Wild Bill Elliott.

Gulliver was at one point married to Chester De Vito, an assistant director. She was also married to Charles Proctor.

While major roles faded and she had uncredited roles, she made movies until 1976 and had a main role in Faces (1968). She died in Valley Center, California on May 23, 1997, aged 88.

Filmography

Sources
 Lamparski, R. (1989) Whatever became of ...?, all new eleventh series, Crown Publishers Inc.: New York. .

References

External links

B-Western Heroines
Dorothy Gulliver at Virtual History
Dorothy Gulliver portrait gallery (University of Washington, Sayre collection)

1908 births
1997 deaths
American film actresses
American silent film actresses
Actresses from Salt Lake City
20th-century American actresses
WAMPAS Baby Stars
Film serial actresses